Neulingen is a municipality in the Enz district in Baden-Württemberg in Germany. It was created on 1 January 1974 from the three independent villages of Bauschlott, Göbrichen, and Nußbaum. It is located on Bertha Benz Memorial Route.

History
Bauschlott and Göbrichen were long-time possessions of the Margraviate and later Grand Duchy of Baden, but Nussbaum belonged to first Herrenalb Abbey and then the Kingdom of Württemberg until being ceded to Baden by treaty on 17 October 1806. Upon annexation, Nussbaum joined the other two towns in the district of Stein. The three were reassigned on 25 May 1821 to the district of Pforzheim, which became  on 25 June 1939. The next year, the three towns merged to form the municipality of Neulingen. The latter town changed its name to Neulingen, after a nearby village named neither Nidlingen or Neidlingen that had ceased to exist in the 14th century.

Geography
Elevation above sea level within the municipal area varies from a low of  Normalnull (NN) to a high of  NN.

Nature reserves
The Bauschlotter Schlosspark, and  Federally-protected nature reserves are located within Neulingen's municipal area.

Coat of arms
Neulingen's municipal coat of arms displays a field of red crossed by a diagonal gold bar, a reference to the House of Zähringen, who ruled the Margraviate and later Grand Duchy of Baden, though the tincture is inverted. The items on this pattern are references to the three towns that merged to form Neulingen. The two black diamonds inside the bar are from Nußbaum, while the golden 'G' above it and the sester below it are from Göbrichen and Bauschlott respectively. The municipal coat of arms was approved by the Enz district office on 15 June 1984.

References

External links
  

Enzkreis
Baden